Dhu Shanatir also spelled Zu Shenatir, was a Hemyarite king who ruled Yemen for 27 years. He was not from the royal family (Tubba'). He was known as "The Man with Earrings".

He is known as one of the first-recorded serial killers. He lured young boys from the royal family into his home with the promise of food and money, stripped them naked and sodomized them. He then killed them by throwing them naked out of an upper-story window of his home. He was only stopped when Zara'h (Dhu Nuwas), stabbed him. Following his assassination, Dhu Shanatir's decapitated head was displayed from the palace window and Dhu Nawas assumed rulership of the Hemyarite Kingdom.

See also
 Hassan Yuha'min
 List of serial killers by country

References

5th-century people
6th-century deaths
History of Saudi Arabia
History of Yemen
Kings of Himyar
Male serial killers
Murdered serial killers
Murderers of children
Year of birth unknown
Yemeni serial killers
Violence against men in Asia
Himyarites
510s deaths